John Farquhar (30 January 1887 – 31 July 1977) was an Australian cricketer. He played in sixteen first-class matches for Queensland between 1913 and 1927.

See also
 List of Queensland first-class cricketers

References

External links
 

1887 births
1977 deaths
Australian cricketers
Queensland cricketers
Cricketers from Queensland